Chelonipus is a trace fossil ichnogenus from the Late Jurassic Morrison Formation. It was found by D. M. Lovelace and S. D. Lovelace.  This particular fossil has been dated to have lived between 251.3 and 150.8 Ma. All Trace fossils are standard carbon dated. The fossil is now distributed in Colorado and Wyoming. The fossil depicts the foot of an animal and was discovered in Colorado in 2012.

Trace Fossils 
A trace fossil is a fossil of a foot, tail or any section of the animal without the animal itself. For more information about trace fossils, see Trace Fossil.

D.M. Lovelace and S. D. Lovelace 
Founders of the ChugWater PaleoEnvironmentalist  group in Wyoming, they discovered the Chelonipus trace fossil. The two are also credited with finding 6 other fossils. for more on their other findings, see (Lovelace Fossil Gallery)

Morrison fauna